The Ischnocera is a large superfamily of lice. They are mostly parasitic on birds, but including a large family (the Trichodectidae) parasitic on mammals. The genus  Trichophilopterus is also found on mammals (lemurs), but probably belongs to the "avian Ischnocera" and represents a host switch from birds to mammals. It is a chewing louse, which feeds on the feathers and skin debris of birds. Many of the avian Ischnocera have evolved an elongated body shape. This allows them to conceal themselves between the feather shafts and avoid being dislodged during preening or flight.

The taxonomy of the group is in need of revision, as several phylogenetic studies have found the group to be paraphyletic, specifically in regards to the two major families Philopteridae and Trichodectidae. In order to resolve this, in 2020 de Moya et al. proposed retaining the majority of the species (including Philopteridae) within Ischnocera, and then moving Trichodectidae to its own grouping called Trichodectera.

Ischnocera currently consists of the following families:
 Philopteroidea
 Goniodidae
 Heptapsogasteridae
 Lipeuridae
 Philopteridae 
 Trichophilopteridae
 Trichodectoidea
 Bovicolidae
 Dasyonygidae
 Trichodectidae

References 

Lice